Susan L. Burke (born July 30, 1962) is an American lawyer known for cases in which she has represented plaintiffs suing the American military or military contractors, such as the Abtan v. Blackwater case. She represented former detainees of Abu Ghraib prison in a suit against interrogators and translators from CACI and Titan Corp. who were tasked with obtaining military intelligence from them during their detention.

Early life and education
Burke, the daughter of a career Army officer, grew up on various Army bases. She majored in international law and politics at Georgetown University, and received her J.D. in 1987 from the Columbus School of Law at the Catholic University of America.

Career
In 2000, Burke became an Equity Partner at the law firm of Montgomery, McCracken, Walker and Rhoads LLP. In August of 2005 she left to form her own firm, which has been known, in turn, as Burke Pyle LLC, Burke O'Neil LLC, and Burke PLLC.

Since establishing her firm, Burke has taken on a number of cases. For example, she has represented accused terrorists who have sought damages from the U.S. Government, which had detained them as enemy combatants. As defense counsel for seventeen plaintiffs who said they had been sexually assaulted by colleagues in the military, she filed suit against former Secretaries of Defense Donald Rumsfeld and Robert Gates on the grounds that they were partially responsible for creating a military environment that made such assaults possible. She also sought payments for the families of Iraqi citizens who had allegedly been killed or injured on a busy Baghdad street by employees of private military company Blackwater.

Reports published in The New York Times and for CBS News were critical of Burke's defense of Abu Ghraib detainees, citing Pentagon reports stating that 14-20% of individuals who have been released from such facilities because they have been deemed not to pose a serious threat allegedly resume terrorist activities.  One such former detainee, Ibrahim Shafir Sen, who was released from Guantanamo and, with Burke as his attorney, filed a suit against Secretary of Defense Donald Rumsfeld, was later re-arrested in Turkey and charged with being a leader of an al-Qaida terrorist cell.  Burke, however, consistently maintains the innocence of her clients, saying of them, "These innocent men were senselessly tortured by U.S. companies that profited from their misery."

During a hearing on the civil immunity of government contractors working at Abu Ghraib, Burke asserted that enemy combatants should have the right to sue U.S. soldiers if the U.S. attorney general "fails to intervene." The court disagreed.

In September 2013 she filed a defamation lawsuit to discover the identities of two anonymous Wikipedia editors who she alleged had inserted misleading information into her Wikipedia article (i.e. this article). One of her goals of the suit was to discover if there was a connection between those two editors and Blackwater. One of the John Does filed an anti-SLAPP lawsuit against Burke, backed by the Center for Individual Rights, asserting that her lawsuit was intended to chill or silence speech. The trial court denied Doe's motion. But on May 29, 2014, the DC Court of Appeals reversed that decision. The appeals court specifically held that "Ms. Burke is public figure," "she is required to show malice on [John Doe's] part in order to succeed on her defamation claim," and that "she is unlikely to be able to do so [show actual malice] here." The appeals court said that Doe could now pursue recovery of legal fees in the trial court.

Notable cases

Abtan v. Blackwater

Burke represented plaintiffs Talib Mutlaq Deewan and the estates of Himoud Saed Abtan, Usama Fadil Abbass and Oday Ismail Ibraheem in a lawsuit against Blackwater (now Academi). The lawsuit, which stemmed from the firefight in Nisoor Square in Baghdad, alleged Blackwater had violated the federal Alien Tort Statute by committing extrajudicial killing and war crimes, and that the company was liable for assault and battery, wrongful death, intentional and negligent infliction of emotional distress, and negligent hiring, training and supervision. The lawsuit was settled on January 6, 2010.

Saleh v. Titan Corp.
In 2008, a federal judge in Virginia allowed former detainees to sue CACI International Inc. and Titan Corp. for mistreatment while being held in Abu Ghraib.  Burke represented a group of men suing these organizations.  The case was dismissed on September 11, 2009, by a panel of the Court of Appeals for the District of Columbia, on the ground that the charges could not be brought against the contractors under the Alien Tort Statute.  On June 27, 2011, the Supreme Court refused to review the case.

Davis v. U.S. Training Center, Inc.
A suit, officially known as United States of America, ex rel. Melan Davis and Brad Davis v. U.S. Training Center, Inc., f/k/a Blackwater Lodge and Training Center, Inc., was filed in the U.S. Fourth Circuit Court of Appeals on October 28, 2011, under the False Claims Act (FCA). The plaintiffs, Melan and Brad Davis, alleged that their former employer, U.S. Training Center, had overbilled and defrauded the U.S. government while providing security services in New Orleans after Hurricane Katrina, as well as in Iraq and Afghanistan. On August 5, 2011, a jury ruled in favor of U.S. Training Center.  Much of the evidence presented had been ruled by Federal Judge T.S. Ellis III to be either inadmissible or unsubstantiated, including the oft-reported claim that the contractors had billed the government for prostitutes.

Burke v. Doe 
These are two precedent setting cases commonly referred to as Burke-I and Burke-II.

In 2013 Burke levied a defamation lawsuit against two Wikipedia editors for confusing the Atban case and a similar criminal case against Blackwater in the text of her Wikipedia entry, in addition to adding other information she believed to be false. Burke claimed that the confusion between cases may have been the result of a conflict-of-interest for the editors in question, alleging that the editors were possibly working for Blackwater at the time of the edits. One of the defending editors' attorneys, Christopher Hajec of the Center for Individual Rights, argued that the lawsuit could have the effect of chilling freedom of speech and the willingness of Wikipedia editors to "edit on matters of public concern". On May 29, 2014, a Washington DC court quashed one of her two subpoenas of John Doe Wikipedia editors, as a result of the application of DC's recent anti-SLAPP laws. The other Wikipedia editor's subpoena was not quashed in the decision.

References 

1962 births
German emigrants to the United States
Living people
American lawyers
Columbus School of Law alumni
Walsh School of Foreign Service alumni
American women lawyers
21st-century American women